Polia purpurissata, the purple arches, is a species of cutworm or dart moth in the family Noctuidae. It is found in North America.

The MONA or Hodges number for Polia purpurissata is 10280.

References

Further reading

 
 
 

Hadenini
Articles created by Qbugbot
Moths described in 1864